U.S. Route 281 Alternate may refer to:

U.S. Route 281 Alternate (Texas), an alternate route of U.S. Route 281 in South Texas
U.S. Route 281 Alternate (Great Bend, Kansas), a former alternate route of U.S. Route 281 in Great Bend, Kansas

81-2 Alternate
Alternate